Icaricia is a Nearctic genus of butterflies in the family Lycaenidae. It was first described by the author and lepidopterist Vladimir Nabokov in 1945.

Species
Listed alphabetically:

 Icaricia acmon (Westwood, [1851])
 Icaricia cotundra (Scott & Fisher, 2006)
 Icaricia icarioides (Boisduval, 1852)
 Icaricia lupini (Boisduval, 1869)
 Icaricia neurona (Skinner, 1902)
 Icaricia saepiolus (Boisduval, 1852)
 Icaricia shasta (Edwards, 1862)

References

External links

 
Lycaenidae genera